Hittin' the Road is an album by American country singer Ernest Tubb, released in 1965 (see 1965 in music).

Track listing
"Give Me a Little Old Fashioned Love" (Ernest Tubb)
"I'm a Sad Lonely Man" (Glenn Raye, Ralph Davis)
"Cocoanut Grove" (Harry Owens)
"All My Friends Are Gonna Be Strangers" (Liz Anderson)
"Throw Your Love My Way" (Tubb, Loys Southerland)
"Afraid to Care" (Jack Greene, Ken Campbell)
"Honeymoon With the Blues" (Eddie Noack, Walt Breeland)
"I'm With a Crowd But So Alone" (Tubb, Carl Story)
"Precious Little Baby" (Lee Roberts)
"Big Beaver" (Bob Wills)
"What Am I Bid" (Leon Rhodes, Clay Allen)
"That's When It's Coming Home to You" (Tubb, Lois Snapp)

Personnel
Ernest Tubb – vocals, guitar
Cal Smith – guitar
Leon Rhodes – guitar
Jerry Shook – guitar, bass
Buddy Charleton – pedal steel guitar
Jack Drake – bass
Jack Greene – drums
Jerry Smith – piano

References

Ernest Tubb albums
1965 albums
Albums produced by Owen Bradley
Decca Records albums